Empusa or Empousa (plural:  Empousai) is a shape-shifting female being in Greek mythology, said to possess a single leg of copper, commanded by Hecate, whose precise nature is obscure. In Late Antiquity, the empousai have been described as a category of phantoms or spectres, equated with the lamiai and mormolykeia, thought to seduce and feed on young men.

In antiquity 
The primary sources for the empousa in Antiquity are Aristophanes's plays (The Frogs and Ecclesiazusae) and Philostratus's Life of Apollonius of Tyana.

Aristophanes
The Empusa has been defined in the Sudas and by Crates of Mallus as a "demonic phantom" with shape-shifting abilities. Thus in Aristophane's plays she is said to change appearance from various beasts to a woman.

The Empusa is also said to be one-legged, namely, having one brass leg, or a donkey's leg, thus being known by the epithets Onokole (Ὀνοκώλη)  and Onoskelis (Ὀνοσκελίς) which they mean "Donkey-footed".
A folk etymology construes the name to mean "one-footed" (from Greek *έμπούς, *empous: en-, one + pous, foot).

In Aristophanes's comedy The Frogs, an Empusa appears before Dionysus and his slave Xanthias on their way to the underworld, although this may be the slave's practical joke to frighten his master. Xanthius thus sees (or pretends to see) the empousa transform into a bull, a mule, a beautiful woman, and a dog. The slave also reassures that the being indeed had one brass (copper) leg, and another leg of cow dung besides.

The Empusa was a being sent by Hecate (as one scholiast noted), or, was Hecate herself, according to a fragment of Aristophanes's lost play Tagenistae ("Men of the Frying-pan"), as preserved in the Venetus.

Life of Apollonius

By the Late Antiquity in Greece, this became a category of beings, designated as empusai (Lat. empusae) in the plural. It came to be believed that the spectre preyed on young men for seduction and for food.

According to 1st century Life of Apollonius of Tyana, the empousa is a phantom (phasma) that took on the appearance of an attractive woman and seduced a young philosophy student in order eventually to devour him. In a different passage of the same work, when Apollonius was journeying from Persia to India, he encountered an empousa, hurling insults at it, coaxing his fellow travellers to join him, whereby it ran and hid, uttering high-pitched screams.

An empousa was also known to others as lamia or mormolyke. This empousa confessed it was fattening up the student she targeted to feed on him, and that she especially craved young men for the freshness and purity of their blood, prompting an interpretation as blood-sucking vampire by Smith′s Dictionary of Greek and Roman Biography and Mythology (1849).

Modern Greek folklore 

In modern times, folklore has been collected about a being fitting the description of an empousa: an extremely slender woman with multiple feet, "one of bronze, one a donkey's foot, one an ox's, one a goat's, and one human", but she was referred to as a woman with the lamia-like body and gait. A field study (Charles Stewart, 1985) finds that empousa is a term that is rarely used in oral tradition, compared to other terms such as gello which has a similar meaning.

Modern interpretations
According to Robert Graves, Empusa was a demigoddess, the beautiful daughter of the goddess Hecate and the spirit Mormo. She feasted on blood by seducing young men as they slept (see sleep paralysis), before drinking their blood and eating their flesh. When she spotted a man sleeping on the road, she attacked him, little knowing he was Zeus, king of the gods. Zeus woke and visited his wrath on her and Empusa was killed.

In fiction
Empusa is referenced in Rudyard Kipling's narrative poem "Tomlinson".

Empusa is a character in Faust, Part Two by Goethe. She appears during the Classical Walpurgis Night as Mephisto is being lured by the Lamiae. She refers to herself as cousin to Mephisto because she has a donkey's foot and he has a horse's.

Empusa is the name of the ship used by Count Orlok to travel to Wisborg in F. W. Murnau's film Nosferatu (1922).

Empusa is a main antagonist turned heroine in the novel Grecian Rune by James Matthew Byers. They may look like humans at first.

In Primal, Empusa is among the Wraith-Aristocrates, a fast travelling race of demons, and the wife of the main-antagonist in the third world.

In Wicked Wings by Keri Arthur, the villains are three empusae who are eating the flesh of their prey. They use the form of a young woman to lure the men to their deaths.

Popular entertainment
In the Percy Jackson & the Olympians series, the Empousai first appear in The Battle of the Labyrinth as servants of Hecate who had, by that time, joined the Titan Army.

Empusa (along with Lamia and Mormo) is one of the three witches in the film Stardust (dir. Matthew Vaughn). She is played by Sarah Alexander. In Neil Gaiman's novel Stardust the witches are not given individual names.

Music

The song "Empusa, Queen of the Damned" by the English deathcore band Infant Annihilator is inspired by the themes of the Greek myth.

See also
 Vrykolakas

Notes

References

Citations

Bibliography 

Female legendary creatures
Greek legendary creatures
Greek sleep deities
Mythological hematophages
Succubi